Bill Congreve is an Australian writer, editor and reviewer of speculative fiction. He has also published the work of Australian science fiction and horror writers under his MirrorDanse imprint.

Biography
Congreve's first work was published in 1987 with his short story "Collector" which was featured in the Summer 1986/1987 edition of Aphelion Science Fiction Magazine.

In 1992 Congreve's first edited anthology was released by Five Islands Press, featuring a short story and introduction by Congreve as well as 10 other stories by different authors.

In 1994 Congreve founded his publishing company MirrorDanse Books which specialises in science fiction and horror.

Congreve won his first award in 1996, winning the William Atheling Jr. Award for his essay "The Hunt for Australian Horror Fiction" which he co-authored with Sean McMullen and Steven Paulsen. At the 2007 Ditmar Awards Congreve won the professional achievement award for his work in MirrorDanse Books and the first two volumes of his anthology Year's Best Australian Science Fiction & Fantasy which he edited with Michelle Marquardt and the award for Best collected work for The Year's Best Australian Science Fiction & Fantasy: Volume Two.

Congreve and his family are based in Sydney. He has a BA in Communications from Macquarie University.

Awards and nominations

Bibliography

Short fiction
"Collector" (1987) in Aphelion Science Fiction Magazine Summer 1986/1987 (ed. Peter McNamara)
"Interview" (1991) in EOD No. 3 (ed. Chris A. Masters)
"Dream" (1992) in Intimate Armageddons (ed. Bill Congreve)
"The Milkman Comes" (1991) in EOD No. 5 (ed. Chris A. Masters)
"In Search of Clean Air" (1992) in EOD No. 8 (ed. Chris A. Masters)
"Totally Gratuitous Horror Story: Part 3: ...and then You Pay Taxes" (1992) in EOD #8 (ed. Chris A. Masters)
"Red Ambrosia" (1993) in Terror Australis: Best Australian Horror (ed. Leigh Blackmore)
"I Am My Father's Daughter" (1993) in Epiphanies of Blood: Tales of Desperation and Thirst (ed. Bill Congreve)
"Sit on My Grave and Tell Me That You Love Me" (1994) in Aurealis No. 13 (ed. Stephen Higgins, Dirk Strasser)
"Mind the Gap" (1994) in Bloodsongs No. 2 (ed. Chris A. Masters, Steve Proposch)
"The Corpse" (1995) in Bonescribes: Year's Best Australian Horror: 1995 (ed. Bill Congreve, Robert Hood)
"Souls Along the Meridian" (1995, as Jacci Olson) in Bonescribes: Year's Best Australian Horror: 1995 (ed. Bill Congreve, Robert Hood)
"Fade to Black" (1996) in Aurealis #17, (ed. Stephen Higgins, Dirk Strasser)
"The Mullet That Screwed John West" (1997) in Epiphanies of Blood: Tales of Desperation and Thirst (ed. Bill Congreve)
"Boy" (1998) in Epiphanies of Blood: Tales of Desperation and Thirst (ed. Bill Congreve)
"Turing Test" (1998) in Epiphanies of Blood: Tales of Desperation and Thirst (ed. Bill Congreve)
"The Death of Heroes" (1998) in Epiphanies of Blood: Tales of Desperation and Thirst (ed. Bill Congreve)
"The Desertion of Corporal Perkins" (2002) in Passing Strange (ed. Bill Congreve)
"Legacy" (2003) in Southern Blood: New Australian Tales of the Supernatural (ed. Bill Congreve)
"The Shooter at the Heartrock Waterhole" (2004) in The Faery Reel: Tales from the Twilight Realm (ed. Terri Windling, Ellen Datlow)
"The Traps of Tumut" (2010) in Aurealis No. 43, (ed. Stuart Mayne)

Anthologies
Intimate Armageddons (1992)
Bonescribes: Year's Best Australian Horror: 1995 (1996) with Robert Hood
Passing Strange (2002)
Southern Blood: New Australian Tales of the Supernatural (2003)
The Year's Best Australian Science Fiction & Fantasy: Volume One (2005, with Michelle Marquardt)
The Year's Best Australian Science Fiction & Fantasy: Volume Two (2006, with Michelle Marquardt)
The Year's Best Australian Science Fiction and Fantasy: Third Annual Volume (2007, with Michelle Marquardt)
The Year's Best Australian Science Fiction and Fantasy: Fourth Annual Volume (2008, with Michelle Marquardt)

Collections
Epiphanies of Blood: Tales of Desperation and Thirst (1998)

Essays
"The Rise of Australian Fantasy" (1993) in Aurealis #12 (ed. Stephen Higgins, Dirk Strasser)
"Out of the Comfort Zone" (1994) in Bloodsongs #1 (ed. Chris A. Masters, Steve Proposch)
"Out of the Comfort Zone" (1994) in Bloodsongs #2 (ed. Chris A. Masters, Steve Proposch)
"Out of the Comfort Zone" (1994) in Bloodsongs #3 (ed. Chris A. Masters, Steve Proposch)
"The Hunt for Australian Horror Fiction" (1995, with Sean McMullen and Steven Paulsen) in Bonescribes: Year's Best Australian Horror: 1995 (ed. Bill Congreve, Robert Hood)
"Australian Horror: 1995" (1996, with Robert Hood) in Bonescribes: Year's Best Australian Horror: 1995 (ed. Bill Congreve, Robert Hood)
 "Intimate Armageddons: A History of a Book." The Australian SF Writers' News No 3 (Sept 1992), 26-30.

References

External links
MirrorDanse Books

Australian male short story writers
Living people
Year of birth missing (living people)